2012 is an EP by grime supergroup Ruff Sqwad. It was released on 24 January 2012 by Takeover Entertainment as a free downloadable EP prior to the release of Ruff Sqwad's third solo studio album, Guns and Roses Volume. 3.

The EP's cover art is a cyberart image of interstellar medium and estrasolar system coordinates, formatted curvilinear coordinates in grey with the color blue as a background.

The "2012 EP" is marked as the group's build up to their third studio album, Guns and Roses Volume 3, due to be released near the end of 2012 on Takeover Entertainment.

Background and recording
The "2012 EP" came after the success of the song "Mario Balotelli", which was included on Tinchy Stryder's fifth extended play, The Wish List. Ruff Sqwad recorded 12 tracks with the sounds having Tinchy Stryder written all over them, and has been compared to Tinchy Sttryder's second studio album Catch 22.

Ruff Sqwad collaborated with JME of Boy Better Know and D Double E of the Newham Generals on the EP.

Reception
The MTV News stated that with the 2012 EP, "nobody likes change, and it seems like they’ve stuck to a formula that they know works. So, regardless of the fact that it may sound a little 2010/11, it’s a sturdy offering scattered with beats that will make you bop your head and lyrics that will make you rewind from time to time".

Track listing

References

External links
 Tinchy Stryder & Ruff Sqwad Interview – 2012 EP, Umbro deal & Jay-Z.

2012 debut EPs
Ruff Sqwad EPs
Takeover Entertainment EPs